Wise Girl is a 1937 American romantic comedy film directed by Leigh Jason and starring Miriam Hopkins, Ray Milland and  Walter Abel. The screenplay concerns a wealthy socialite who tries to gain custody of her orphaned nieces.

Plot
Susan Fletcher (Miriam Hopkins) and her millionaire father, Simon (Henry Stephenson), are eager to take care of her late sister's two daughters, Joan and Katie, but her deceased brother-in-law's will placed them in the custody of his brother, John O'Halloran (Ray Milland). Mr. Fletcher's lawyers inform him that there is nothing they can do, unless John can be shown to be unemployed. However, though he loses jobs frequently, he also seems to be able to find new ones just as quickly. Susan decides to investigate.

She passes herself off as an impoverished actress and talks John's kindly landlord into giving her a place to stay. She becomes acquainted with John, a struggling painter, the two girls, and their friends, boxer/sculptor Mike Malloy (Guinn Williams) and harmless alcoholic Karl Stevens (Walter Abel). Susan and John begin to fall in love, but when Susan tries to help him out, it only seems to lose him all of his jobs. When she informs her father of these developments, he is delighted. Despite her protests, he has the authorities pick up the two girls for a custody hearing. John learns of Susan's real identity, and assumes she is in on the plot.

As John is now out of work, the girls are given to the Fletchers. When it becomes clear to Susan that they are desperately unhappy to be away from John, she tells them they can go home. However, when they find her weeping over the whole mess, they agree that her plan to keep them so that John will have time to paint is a good one, and agree to stay.

Stubborn, John rejects Susan's suggestion that he enter a painting contest with a large prize of money. Susan gets the police to put John in jail on trumped up charges, and sees to it that he gets no food unless he paints. He finally caves in, then paints an unflattering caricature of her and her father. To his surprise, Susan is delighted with the work and arranges to sell it for a large sum. When John is released, he realizes that Susan is looking out for his welfare, and the couple reconcile.

Cast
 Miriam Hopkins as Susan Fletcher
 Ray Milland as John O'Halloran
 Walter Abel as Karl Stevens
 Henry Stephenson as Simon Fletcher
 Alec Craig as Dermot O'Neil
 Guinn Williams as Mike Malloy
 Betty Philson as Joan O'Halloran
 Marianna Strelby as Katie O'Halloran
 Margaret Dumont as Mrs. Bell-Rivington
 Jean De Briac as George (as Jean deBriac)
 Ivan Lebedeff as Prince Michael
 Rafael Storm as Prince Ivan
 Gregory Gaye as Prince Leopold
 Richard Lane as 1st Detective
 Tom Kennedy as 2nd Detective
 James Finlayson as the Sheriff

Reception
The film recorded a loss of $114,000.

References

External links
 
 
 
 

1937 films
American romantic comedy films
American screwball comedy films
American black-and-white films
Films about orphans
Films directed by Leigh Jason
1937 romantic comedy films
1930s American films